Vít Müller (born 31 August 1996) is a Czech athlete specialising in the 400 metres hurdles.	He won a bronze medal in the 4 × 400 metres relay at the 2017 Summer Universiade.

International competitions

Personal bests
Outdoor
200 metres – 21.17 (-0.7 m/s, Ostrava 2018)
400 metres – 46.56 (Prague 2018)
400 metres hurdles – 49.36 (Bydgoszcz 2019)
Indoor
200 metres – 21.39 (Ostrava 2019)
400 metres – 46.63 (Ostrava 2019)

References

1996 births
Living people
Czech male hurdlers
Universiade bronze medalists for the Czech Republic
Universiade medalists in athletics (track and field)
Czech Athletics Championships winners
Medalists at the 2017 Summer Universiade
Competitors at the 2019 Summer Universiade
Olympic athletes of the Czech Republic
Athletes (track and field) at the 2020 Summer Olympics